Megalovryso, known before 1927 as Nivoliani, is a village and a community of the Agia municipality. The 2011 census recorded 199 inhabitants in the village. The community of Megalovryso covers an area of 17.128 km2.

Population
According to the 2011 census, the population of the settlement of Megalovryso was 199 people, a decrease of almost 55% compared with the population of the previous census of 2001.

See also
 List of settlements in the Larissa regional unit

References

Populated places in Larissa (regional unit)